Maralbexi County (Maralbeshi, Maralbishi, transliterated from), Bachu County, and ) the former long Chinese name as well, is located in the southwest of the Xinjiang Uyghur Autonomous Region of the People's Republic of China and is under the administration of the Kashgar Prefecture. According to the 2002 census, it has a population of 380,000.

History
In 1913, Maralbexi County was established.

In September 1937, two regiments of Soviet Kirghiz troops and one regiment of Russian troops equipped with forty airplanes and twenty tanks entered Sinkiang from Atushe and attacked Maralbexi, dividing Ma Hushan's 36th Corps into two sections.

In February 2002, a 6.7 magnitude earthquake killed 267 people in Maralbexi County and Payzawat County.

On February 24, 2003, the 2003 Bachu earthquake occurred.

In April 2013, twenty-one died in an incident in Seriqbuya.

In October 2014, twenty-two died in an incident at a farmer's market in the county.

According to her husband, in May-June 2017, Mailikemu Maimati / Malika Mamiti, in her 30s, native of the county and wife of businessman Mirza Imran Baig of Pakistan, in his 40s, was detained in the county's re-education camp. After her release, she and their young son were not given their passports by Chinese authorities.

Administrative divisions
Maralbexi County includes four towns, eight townships and other areas:

Towns (بازىرى / 镇)
Maralbeshi (Bachu Town;  / 巴楚镇), Seriqbuya (Serikbuya, Selibuya;  / 色力布亚镇), Awat (Awati;  / ), Achal (Sanchakou;  / 三岔口镇)
Townships (يېزىسى / 乡)
 Charbagh Township (Qia'erbage;  / 恰尔巴格乡), Doletbagh Township (Duolaitibage;  / 多来提巴格乡), Anarkol Township (Anakule; ئاناركۆل يېزىسى / 阿纳库勒乡), Shamal Township (Xiamale;  / 夏玛勒乡), Aqsaqmaral Township (Akesakemarele;  / 阿克萨克马热勒乡 / 阿克萨克玛热勒乡), Alaghir Township (Alage'er;  / 阿拉格尔乡 / 阿拉根乡), Chongqurchaq (Qiongku'erqiake;  / 琼库尔恰克乡 / 琼库恰克乡), Yengiosteng Township (Yingwusitang;  / )
Others
Xiahe Forest Plantation (下河林场), 兵团48团, 兵团52团

Transportation
Bachu is served by the Southern Xinjiang Railway and G3012 Turpan–Hotan Expressway.

Economy
Agricultural products include corn, cotton, wheat and others as well as sword-leaf dogbane. The central and eastern parts of the county have old desert poplar forests. Animal herding is prominent and rock salt and phosphate fertilizer are produced in the county. Industries include food processing, plastics, rug making, electricity and construction.

, there was about 30,600 acres (202,728 mu) of cultivated land in Maralbexi.

Demographics

As of 2015, 363,488 of the 382,186 residents of the county were Uyghur, 17,816 were Han Chinese and 882 were from other ethnic groups.

, the population of Maralbexi County was 95.13% Uyghur.

As of 1999, 83.12% of the population of Maralbexi (Bachu) County was Uyghur and 16.41% of the population was Han Chinese.

Geography

Climate

Notable persons
 He Jing (TV presenter)

Historical maps
Historical English-language maps including Maralbexi:

See also
 Yarkand River

Notes

References

External links

Introduction to Maralbishi County, official website of Kashgar Prefecture government.

County-level divisions of Xinjiang
Kashgar Prefecture
Populated places along the Silk Road